Aluminium monoiodide is an aluminium(I) compound with the chemical formula AlI. It is unstable at room temperature due to dismutation:

6AlI -> {Al2I6} + 4Al

It forms a cyclic adduct Al4I4(NEt3)4 with triethylamine.

See also
Aluminium monofluoride
Aluminium monochloride
Aluminium monobromide

References 

Aluminium(I) compounds
Iodides
Metal halides